Richard M. Davidson is an Old Testament scholar at Andrews University, Michigan, where he is currently the J. N. Andrews Professor of Old Testament Exegesis.

Biography 
Davidson was the president of the Adventist Theological Society from 1996-1998. He is married to JoAnn Davidson.

Flame of Yahweh 
Davidson is best known for his major academic work Flame of Yahweh: A Theology of Sexuality in the Old Testament, published in 2007.  The title is derived from the Biblical verse . He has been studying the topic of sexuality in the Old Testament since the early 1980s.  Grenville Kent writes "Davidson is to be commended for an OT biblical theology of sexuality which is fearless, deep and comprehensive – almost encyclopaedic."  Other reviewers of this work include Anselm C. Hagedorn, C. Amos, J. Harold Ellens, Yael Klangswisan, Dale Launderville, Harvey E. Solganick, Nicholas T. Batzig, Jennifer L. Koosed, Heather Macumber, and James D. Lorenz.

According to one reviewer, "From the structural point of view, the book forms a literary envelope. Davidson begins with the theology of sexuality depicted in the narrative of the Garden of Eden and closes the book with the restoration of that theology in the book of Song of Solomon. There we again find a couple deeply in love in the setting of a garden."

See also

 Seventh-day Adventist Church
 Seventh-day Adventist theology
 Seventh-day Adventist eschatology
 History of the Seventh-day Adventist Church
 28 Fundamental Beliefs
 Questions on Doctrine
 Teachings of Ellen G. White
 Inspiration of Ellen G. White
 Prophecy in the Seventh-day Adventist Church
 Investigative judgment
 The Pillars of Adventism
 Second Coming
 Conditional Immortality
 Historicism
 Three Angels' Messages
 End times
 Sabbath in seventh-day churches
 Ellen G. White
 Adventist Review
 Adventism
 Seventh-day Adventist Church Pioneers
 Seventh-day Adventist worship

References

External links 
 Scholarly and non-scholarly articles by Davidson and about Davidson as cataloged in the Seventh-day Adventist Periodical Index (SDAPI)

American Christian theologians
Seventh-day Adventist theologians
American Seventh-day Adventists
Living people
Andrews University faculty
American biblical scholars
Old Testament scholars
Year of birth missing (living people)